HSwMS Drottning Victoria was a  (Pansarskepp) for the Royal Swedish Navy in the 1910s.

Notable commanders of the ship include Gösta Ehrensvärd between 1932 and 1933, Yngve Ekstrand in 1936 and 1937 and Stig H:son Ericson during 1942 and part of 1943.

Plans were drawn up in the 1940s to modernize Drottning Victoria by rebuilding the superstructure, increasing the elevation of the main turrets to 32 degrees, and replacing the light armament with 2 twin 57mm guns and 12 40mm/56 Bofors guns in 4 twin and 4 single mounts, as well as 10 25mm Bofors mounts. This would have more than doubled the weight of anti-aircraft fire per minute. These plans were never undertaken. The plans and an essay explaining them can be viewed in here on pages 103 to 113.

References

Bibliography
 
 </ref>
 

Sverige-class coastal defence ships
Ships built in Gothenburg
1917 ships